William Robert Johnson (November 19, 1918—July 28, 1986) was an American prelate of the Roman Catholic Church. He served as bishop of the Diocese of Orange in California from 1976 until his death in 1986.  He previously served as an auxiliary bishop of the Archdiocese of Los Angeles in California from 1971 to 1976.

Biography

Early life 
William Johnson was born on November 19, 1918, in Tonopah, Nevada, to Jorgen and Marie (née O'Connell) Johnson. In the early 1920s, the family moved to Los Angeles, California, where he enrolled at St. Ignatius School. He attended Los Angeles College, the minor seminary of what was then the Diocese of Los Angeles-San Diego, from 1932 to 1938. He completed his theological studies at St. John's Seminary in Camarillo, California.

Priesthood
Johnson was ordained to the priesthood for the Archdiocese of Los Angeles by Archbishop John J. Cantwell on May 28, 1944.After several years of pastoral work, Johnson was sent to the Catholic University of America in Washington, D.C., where he earned a Master of Social Work degree. He was named assistant director of the Catholic Welfare Bureau in 1948, and later succeeded Monsignor Alden J. Bell as director in 1956. Johnson was elected to the board of directors for the National Conference of Catholic Charities in 1960, becoming president in 1964. He was named a papal chamberlain in 1960, and raised to the rank of domestic prelate in 1965. In addition to his duties as director of the Catholic Welfare Bureau, Johnson served as pastor of Holy Name of Jesus Parish, the first Catholic parish for African Americans in Los Angeles, from 1962 to 1968. He was pastor of American Martyrs Parish in Manhattan Beach, California (1968–71), and became parochial vicar for St. Vibiana's Cathedral in 1970.

Auxiliary Bishop of Los Angeles 
On February 19, 1971, Johnson was appointed auxiliary bishop of the Archdiocese of Los Angeles and titular bishop of Blera by Pope Paul VI. He received his episcopal consecration on March 25, 1971, from Archbishop Timothy Manning, with Archbishop Joseph T. McGucken and Bishop Alden Bell serving as co-consecrators. He selected as his episcopal motto: Caritas Christi (Latin: "Charity of Christ"). As an auxiliary bishop, he assisted Archbishop Manning for five years.

Bishop of Orange
Johnson was named by Paul VI as the first bishop of the newly erected Diocese of Orange on March 24, 1976. His installation took place at the Cathedral of the Holy Family on June 16 of that year. He celebrated Mass with inmates at the Orange County Jail every Christmas, and established a Department of Hispanic Ministries in 1979. He described the church before the Second Vatican Council as "a fairly rigid, centralized structure from the top down to the parish," and declared, "I certainly relish the changes that have occurred in the Church since" the Council. He was an outspoken advocate of nuclear disarmament, and encouraged Catholics to support the settlement of refugees from Southeast Asia.

Johnson suffered from kidney problems and related illnesses for the last year of his life, eventually using a wheelchair. William Johnson died from a bacterial infection at St. Joseph Hospital in Orange, California, on July 28, 1986, at age 67.

References

Episcopal succession

1918 births
1986 deaths
People from Tonopah, Nevada
St. John's Seminary (California) alumni
Catholic University of America alumni
20th-century Roman Catholic bishops in the United States
Catholics from Nevada